Satbayev, until 1990 Nikolsk, is a city in Kazakhstan's Ulytau Region. The city is named after Kanysh Satbayev, one of the founders of Soviet metallogeny, principal advocate and the first president of Kazakhstan Academy of Sciences. As of 2019, the city has population of 69,782.

History 
The place was originally established in 1954 for miners from Jezkazgan. Later, in 1956, it was renamed to Nikolsk. In 1973, Nikolsk received town status. The city got its status by huge exploration work initiated by Kanysh Imantayevich Satpayev, it was given the name Satpayev after him on September 13, 1990. Satbayev is the center of the mining industry.

Transportation
Passenger-train service is provided on the train line between Almaty and Zhezkazgan, a city some twenty kilometers away.

Air traffic is served by the nearby Zhezkazgan Airport.

References

Cities and towns in Kazakhstan
Ulytau Region
Cities and towns built in the Soviet Union